Ranch to Market Road 620 (RM 620) is a ranch to market road in the U.S. state of Texas maintained by the Texas Department of Transportation (TxDOT). The  road begins at  SH 71 in Bee Cave in Travis County west of Austin passing along southeastern Lake Travis, western Austin, and several suburban communities west and north of Austin before ending at Bus. I-35-L in Round Rock in Williamson County. The road has major intersections with  I-35,  US 183, and  SH 45.

History
RM 620 was originally designated on July 9, 1945 as Farm to Market Road 620 (FM 620) from Round Rock to  SH 29, the former designation of US 183 south of Liberty Hill until May 23, 1951. On May 13, 1946, the road was extended to the Travis County line. On August 26, 1948, the road was extended to the former community of Hickmuntown, also called Four Points, at the location of the current intersection with RM 2222. The road was completed on December 17, 1952 when it was extended to SH 71, known locally before August 31, 1965 as RM 93 (but was signed as SH 71 since October 31, 1955). The road received its Ranch to Market designation on October 1, 1956. The SH 45 toll road running along a portion of RM 620 opened in 2006. On February 28, 2013, the section from IH-35 to BI 35-L was cancelled and given to the city of Round Rock, along with part of BI 35-L itself. On June 27, 2019, RM 620 Spur was designated from RM 620 northeast to RM 2222 along the westernmost portion of PASS 1402 (Arterial 8); however, RM 620 Spur has not been constructed yet.

On June 27, 1995 the internal designation of the route was changed to Urban Road 620 (UR 620); the designation reverted to RM 620 with the elimination of the Urban Road system on November 15, 2018.

Route description
The western terminus of RM 620 is at SH 71 in Bee Cave in Travis County. From there, it travels north through the city of Lakeway, following along southeastern Lake Travis until it crosses the Colorado River at Mansfield Dam near Marshall Ford. To the northeast, RM 620 enters the city of Austin and intersects RM 2222. The road then intersects  RM 2769 just inside the Williamson County line. To the east, the road travels concurrently with the free service roads of the SH-45 toll road crossing US-183, the 183A Toll Road, and  FM 734 before separating from SH 45 and entering Round Rock. The road intersects I-35 before terminating at Bus. I-35-L in Round Rock.

The western segment of RM 620 between SH 71 and RM 2769 is designated a scenic roadway by the City of Austin.

Major intersections

References

0620
Transportation in Austin, Texas
Transportation in Travis County, Texas
Transportation in Williamson County, Texas